Robert Trimble (November 17, 1776 – August 25, 1828) was a lawyer and jurist who served as Justice of the Kentucky Court of Appeals, as United States district judge of the United States District Court for the District of Kentucky and as Associate Justice of the Supreme Court of the United States from 1826 to his death in 1828. During his brief Supreme Court tenure he authored several majority opinions, including the decision in Ogden v. Saunders, which was the only majority opinion that Chief Justice John Marshall ever dissented from during his 34 years on the Court.

Early life and career

Trimble was born on November 17, 1776, in Berkeley County, Virginia to William Trimble (d. 1806) and Mary McMillan. He was three years old when his family emigrated to the Cumberland Plateau region of Virginia's Kentucky County, initially to Fort Boonesborough and then to a settlement in present-day Clark County, Kentucky.

He attended Transylvania University and read law under two attorneys, first George Nicholas and then (after Nicholas' death in 1799) James Brown. He was licensed to practice law by the Kentucky Court of Appeals in 1803 and began a law practice in Paris, Kentucky. He established his office at Eades Tavern, which also became his home.

On August 18, 1803, he married Nancy P. Timberlake; together they had at least 10 children. Their daughter Rebecca married Garrett Davis, who represented Kentucky in the U.S. House (1839–1847) and then in the U.S. Senate (1861–1872). Another of Trimble's daughters was the mother of James G. Jones, the first mayor of Evansville, Indiana and the third Indiana Attorney General.

Trimble was elected to represent Bourbon County in the Kentucky House of Representatives in 1802. A staunch Jeffersonian Republican, he served only one term, as he intensely disliked the tumult of politics. He thereafter refused election to any public office, including two nominations to the U.S. Senate.

In 1807, Trimble accepted an appointment to the Kentucky Court of Appeals, but resigned in 1809 for financial and family reasons; he later declined an appointment to become that Court's chief justice in 1810. From 1813 to 1817 he served as United States Attorney for the District of Kentucky. During this time, Trimble proved himself a tireless legal researcher and an energetic prosecutor. Trimble also owned twenty-three slaves at the time of the 1820 census.

Federal judicial service

U.S. District Court for Kentucky
Trimble was nominated as District Judge for the U.S. District Court for Kentucky by President James Madison on January 28, 1817. Confirmed by the U.S. Senate on January 31, 1817, he served for nine years, until his appointment to the Supreme Court of the United States in May 1826.

Supreme Court

Nomination and confirmation
Trimble was nominated as an associate justice of the U.S. Supreme Court by President John Quincy Adams on April 11, 1826, to succeed Thomas Todd. Opposition to the nomination came from fellow Kentuckian, Senator John Rowan, whose states' rights views ran counter to positions taken by Trimble while serving on the circuit court that favored federal authority over state authority. The effort to stall the nomination failed, and Trimble was confirmed by the U.S. Senate on May 9, 1826, by a 27-5 vote.

Tenure
Trimble served on the Court from June 16, 1826 until August 25, 1828. During his Supreme Court tenure, Trimble generally agreed with the opinions of Chief Justice John Marshall. In a notable departure, he wrote the majority opinion in the case of Ogden v. Saunders; Marshall wrote the dissenting opinion in the case.

Death and legacy

Following the 1828 Supreme Court term, Trimble returned home. That summer, he became ill with a bilious fever and died on August 25, at the age of 52. He was interred in Paris Cemetery.
Following Trimble's death, Chief Justice Marshall wrote to Senator Henry Clay saying,

Justice Joseph Story, who served with Trimble, wrote,

Trimble County, Kentucky, established in 1837, is named for Justice Trimble. Also, the Liberty ship , built in Brunswick, Georgia during World War II, was named in his honor.

See also
List of justices of the Supreme Court of the United States

Notes

References

External links
  Links to all opinions written by Robert Trimble on the US Supreme Court, from www.courtlistener.com
 Robert Trimble at the Biographical Directory of Federal Judges, a public domain publication of the Federal Judicial Center.
 Justices 1789 to Present, www.supremecourt.gov, Supreme Court of the United States.

1776 births
1828 deaths
19th-century American judges
American Presbyterians
American prosecutors
Judges of the United States District Court for the District of Kentucky
Kentucky Democratic-Republicans
Kentucky state court judges
Members of the Kentucky House of Representatives
People from Berkeley County, West Virginia
United States Attorneys for the District of Kentucky
United States federal judges appointed by James Madison
United States federal judges appointed by John Quincy Adams
Justices of the Supreme Court of the United States
United States federal judges admitted to the practice of law by reading law
American slave owners
Judges of the Kentucky Court of Appeals